Boonville station is a historic train station located at Boonville, Cooper County, Missouri. It was built in 1912 by the Missouri–Kansas–Texas Railroad. It is a one-story, nine bay, Mission Revival-Spanish Colonial Revival style building sheathed in stucco. A projecting bay which houses a telegrapher's station and the patrons' and trainmen's lobby. It features stepped and arched brick parapets at each gable end supported by three arched columns.

The station was listed on the National Register of Historic Places in 1990 as the Missouri, Kansas and Texas Railroad Depot.

References

Railway stations in the United States opened in 1912
Railway stations on the National Register of Historic Places in Missouri
Spanish Colonial Revival architecture in the United States
Mission Revival architecture in Missouri
Boonville
1912 establishments in Missouri
National Register of Historic Places in Cooper County, Missouri
Former railway stations in Missouri
Transportation in Cooper County, Missouri
Boonville, Missouri